Isak Alexander Jansson (born 31 January 2002) is a Swedish professional footballer who plays as a winger or forward for Segunda División club FC Cartagena.

Club career
Born in Kinna, Jansson represented Kinna IF and Skene IF as a youth. In May 2018, after already making his senior debut with the latter, he joined Kalmar FF.

After making his first team debut for Kalmar in 2019, Jansson established himself as a regular starter during the 2020 season onwards. He scored his first professional goal on 25 April 2021, netting the winner in a 1–0 home success over Örebro SK.

On 1 August 2022, Jansson moved abroad and signed a three-year contract with FC Cartagena of the Spanish Segunda División.

Career statistics

Club

Notes

References

External links

2002 births
Living people
Swedish footballers
Association football wingers
Association football forwards
Allsvenskan players
Division 3 (Swedish football) players
Kalmar FF players
FC Cartagena footballers
Sweden youth international footballers
Swedish expatriate footballers
Swedish expatriate sportspeople in Spain
Expatriate footballers in Spain